The .357 Maximum, formally known as the .357 Remington Maximum or the .357 Max, is a super magnum handgun cartridge originally developed by Elgin Gates as the wildcat .357 SuperMag. The .357 Maximum was introduced into commercial production as a joint-venture by Remington Arms Company and Ruger in 1983 as a new chambering for the Ruger Blackhawk. Shortly thereafter, Dan Wesson Firearms and Thompson/Center Arms introduced firearms in this cartridge. United Sporting Arms chambered it in their Silhouette series single-action revolvers. It is a .357 Magnum case lengthened . Based on the .357 Magnum cartridge, a revolver or single-shot pistol designed for the .357 Remington Maximum will chamber and fire .360 Dan Wesson,  .357 Magnum, .38 Special, .38 Long Colt, and .38 Short Colt rounds. Intended primarily as a silhouette cartridge, such high velocity and energy levels have hunting applications.

Despite good performance, the high pressure and velocity of the cartridge caused flame cutting of revolver top straps, due to the use of light  bullets, and the cartridge has since been dropped by all manufacturers who so chambered their revolvers. Single shot pistols and rifles (i.e. Thompson/Center Contender) are still available in this caliber, and remain popular among handloaders. Unprimed brass is still produced every few years by Remington, and is also a stock item from Starline.

Performance

Legacy
Guns designed for the .357 Maximum were built on a larger frame than their predecessors. Although Ruger only made about 7,700 Blackhawks chambered in .357 Maximum, the frame size has been used as a base gun to build bigger revolvers in .445 SuperMag, .475 Linebaugh Long/Maximum, and .500 Linebaugh Long/Maximum.

In the 2011 movie Flypaper, Wyatt "Jelly" Jenkins (Pruitt Taylor Vince) uses a Dan Wesson Model 40 VH which is chambered in .357 Remington Maximum as his main sidearm.

See also
 List of handgun cartridges

References

Pistol and rifle cartridges
Remington Arms cartridges
Magnum pistol cartridges
Wildcat cartridges